The third and final season of Hawthorne premiered on TNT on June 14, 2011. The season contained 10 episodes. Season 3 concluded on August 16, 2011 and was cancelled shortly after.

Season synopsis 
The third season focuses on Christina and Tom's struggling relationship due to the fact she lost her baby in an assault and she gets even more depressed when she loses her job.

Cast

Main cast 
 Jada Pinkett Smith as Christina Hawthorne, former Chief Nursing Officer of James River, Present COO of James River
 Suleka Mathew as Nurse Bobbie Jackson
 Michael Vartan as Dr. Tom Wakefield
 Hannah Hodson as Camille Hawthorne
 Marc Anthony as Detective Nick Renata
 Vanessa Lengies as Scrub Nurse Kelly Epson
 Adam Rayner as Dr. Steve Shaw

Recurring cast 
 Anne Ramsay as Dr. Brenda Marshall
 Derek Luke as Dr. Miles Bourdet
 James Morrison as John Morrissey, former CEO of James River Hospital
 Vanessa Bell Calloway as Nurse Gail Strummer, former Chief Nursing Officer of James River
 Christina Moore as Candy Sullivan

Production 
On September 14, 2010, TNT renewed Hawthorne for a 10 episode third and final season slated to begin on June 14, 2011. Marc Anthony has joined the main cast beginning with season three. Nurse Ray Stein played by David Julian Hirsh did not return for Season 3. It was left unknown what happened to his character.

Episodes

References 

2011 American television seasons

it:Episodi di Hawthorne - Angeli in corsia (seconda stagione)